Louveau is a surname. Notable people with the surname include:

 Adrien Louveau (born 2000), French association football player
 Catherine Louveau (born 1950), French sociologist and academic
 Henri Louveau (1910–1991), French racing driver